Telesouth Communications Inc, also known as SuperTalk Mississippi Media, is an American, commercial radio network based in Jackson, Mississippi. Its stations across Mississippi broadcast either a music format, or conservative news / talk and sports under the SuperTalk brand.

The network's talk stations carry a mix of syndicated national shows, its programming, and material produced at the individual stations. Sports schedules are matched to teams based in local markets.

History

In 1979, Steve Davenport was hired to manage the Love Communications owned Mississippi Agriculture and News Network in Jackson, Mississippi. Shortly afterwards it was purchased by Baton Rouge based Interstate Communications and merged with Louisiana Network Inc. Soon, production of news reports and short features for Mississippi radio stations evolved to include longer lifestyle, and sports phone-in programs.

The firm began broadcasting live football and basketball from the University of Southern Mississippi in 1984 and went on to take sports broadcast franchises for the University of Mississippi and University of Southern Mississippi. As well as programming for Mississippi and Louisiana, the South Carolina News Network was also produced from Jackson until 2008.

Following disagreement over a $25,000 annual franchise fee for the Ole Miss Rebels, Steve Davenport and his business partners the Hanley family of Hazlehurst agreed to purchase Interstate Communications' Mississippi market business, Mississippi Networks Inc, for $300,000 in 1985. Davenport bought out the Hanley's stake in 2008.

Amid financial turmoil in 1988, Telesouth sold its newly acquired Biloxi radio station. However, it went on to buy radio stations, eventually covering all 82 counties of Mississippi.

In 1995, the business name was changed to Telesouth Communications Inc, and in 1997 current flagship WFMN (Flora) and WTCD (Indianola) stations were purchased and converted to pioneer a "SuperTalk" conservative talk show format.

Jackson State Tigers football was added to the sport broadcast roster in 1998, and the Southern Urban News Network established to produce news features for radio stations in urban markets across Mississippi. The Urban News Network was merged with the firm's Mississippi News Network in 2011.

Telesouth began to divest college sports broadcast franchises from 2011, and to purchase music radio stations. The franchise agreement with Ole Miss had been renewed in 2007 guaranteeing a minimum fee of $27 million over ten years and substantial investment by the broadcaster in facilities at Vaught–Hemingway Stadium, including a $6 million jumbotron. The agreement was taken over by Learfield in 2012.  The franchise fee, payable by Telesouth to the University of Mississippi, for its final year of Ole Miss Rebels football was $3 million.

Purchases included Biloxi music stations from Alpha Media in 2018.

Between 2013 and 2018, sport, and then feel-good and lifestyle programming, were added to the SuperTalk format broadcast on Telesouth's 12 talk radio stations.

In 2019, the company began video broadcast of SuperTalk programming on C Spire cable.

Radio stations

Talk shows

, Supertalk's schedule includes:-

Network
The Gallo Radio Show - Presenter, Paul Gallo - Producer, Perez Hodge
Coast Vue with Ricky Mathews
MidDays with Gerard Gibert - Producer, Ryne "Ryno" Montgomery
In a Mississippi Minute with Steve Azar
Good Things with Rebecca Turner - Producer, Ryne "Ryno" Montgomery
SportsTalk Mississippi - Presenters, Richard Cross, Michael Borkey and Brian Hadad
Outdoors with Ricky Mathews
Garden Mama
The Handy Man Radio Show
Richard Schwartz Legal Power Hour

National
The Lars Larson Show
The Ben Shapiro Show
The Michael Knowles Show
Coast to Coast AM
America in The Morning

The JT and Dave Show

JT Williamson and Dave Ingram began to co-host the JT & Dave Show on SuperTalk in 2002. Long-time producer and occasional on-air contributor was “Scary” Gary O’Cain. Their guests on the show were often prominent Mississippi politicians and the pair addressed controversial topics in the state from a conservative perspective. The daily, three-hour shows campaigned for charter schools and to repeal traffic camera legislation. Phone-in callers that disagreed with the presenters were characteristically dealt with in a robust manner. Ingram left the show in 2010 and the abrupt nature of his departure prompted speculation on internet forums.

The show was briefly renamed Air Bubba, then the JT Show, and in a departure from interviewing Mississippi's state politicians in 2016, it hosted British campaigner Nigel Farage. Williamson announced he had been diagnosed with Lymphoma in 2020 and died that year.

News networks

	
, SuperTalk's general, statewide news service is carried by 48 Mississippi affiliate radio stations. Thirty six broadcast its Agrinews package covering commodity prices and farming topics.

College athletes' image rights

Telesouth Communications Inc was one of the defendants in a putative class action lawsuit brought by Steven Clarke and nine other amateur college athletes. They alleged athletic conferences, broadcast networks and licensing agencies (including Telesouth) improperly colluded to exclude them from the market for their image rights, and set those fees they received at zero or lower than what they would otherwise have achieved.

Judge Kevin H Sharp's 2015 decision in the United States District Court for the Middle District of Tennessee accepted that college sports was "big business", but concluded the way athletes had been required to surrender their images rights was lawful.

References

External links

American radio networks

Companies based in Jackson, Mississippi
Mass media in Jackson, Mississippi
News and talk radio stations in the United States